Marist Brothers International School (MBIS), founded in 1951, is an international Montessori - Grade 12 school located in Kobe, Japan. The school is accredited by the US-based Western Association of Schools and Colleges (WASC).

Marist has an enrollment of approximately 300 students from Japan and other countries. It is credited as being the only international Marist Brothers school in the world.

Marist uses the American Curriculum, with most juniors and seniors partaking in the SATs.

The school is divided into three parts:

Ch1-Ch2- Montessori
1st-6th Grade- Elementary
7th-12th Grade- Upper School

Student body
The Marist facility has a capacity of 535 students. As of 2022, Marist had 318 students.

Course levels
Marist has a different course levels and types to accommodate the different needs of students. Types include Advanced Placement (AP) and Honors. English as a Second Language (ESL) programs are offered to English Language Learners (ELLs).

Extracurricular activities

Sports
Marist is home of the Bulldogs. Students have the option of participating in soccer, basketball, volleyball, baseball for the boys, and softball for the girls. The Bulldogs regularly enter competitions with other international schools from and around Japan. Various sport tournaments are hosted by Marist throughout the year with the help of the student-run, Marist Athletics Association.

Student Government
Marist has a student government system in which each class elects representatives to represent their best interests in the Student Council. The Student Council meets on a weekly basis to plan and prepare for upcoming events or address any questions or concerns raised by classmates.

Clubs and Organizations
Marist sponsors many student run organizations. These organizations include the following:

National Honor Society, Marist Athletics Association, Student Council, Global Issues Network, Japanese Cultural Club, Yearbook Club, Marist Band, and Robotics Club, as well as many others.

Model United Nations
Marist hosts the annual Model United Nations (MUN), welcoming international schools from both within Japan and overseas. Regular attendees include Canadian Academy, Osaka International School, Senri International School, and International School of the Sacred Heart.

Five resolutions are covered and debated within the course of 3 days. At the end of the 3-day event, awards are given out to those delegates who have done an exceptional job in fulfilling the requirements of a successful UN delegate.

See also
 Education in Kobe

References

External links
 http://www.marist.ac.jp
 https://web.archive.org/web/20040705010329/http://www.marist-kobe.com/ (Alumni Website)

Elementary schools in Japan
International schools in Kobe